"The Way We Make a Broken Heart" is a song written by John Hiatt. It was recorded by Ry Cooder in 1980 on his album Borderline. "The Way We Make a Broken Heart" was covered by both John Hiatt and Rosanne Cash in 1983 as a duet. The single was produced by Scott Mathews and Ron Nagle, however, Geffen Records did not release the single. Willy DeVille performed this song twice in Berlin 2002; once in an unplugged version and once with his electric band. This is documented on his 2002 album Live in Berlin. Asleep At The Wheel also recorded the song on their 1985 album Pasture Prime under the title "This Is the Way We Make a Broken Heart".

1987 recording
Rosanne Cash re-recorded the song in 1987 and it went all the way to number one on the US country charts where it was her sixth single to go to number one.

Charts

Weekly charts

Year-end charts

References

1987 singles
1980 songs
Asleep at the Wheel songs
Rosanne Cash songs
Songs written by John Hiatt
Columbia Records singles
Song recordings produced by Rodney Crowell